East Washington Street Historic District may refer to:

East Washington Street Historic District (Martinsville, Indiana), listed on the National Register of Historic Places in Morgan County, Indiana
East Washington Street Historic District (South Bend, Indiana), listed on the National Register of Historic Places in St. Joseph County, Indiana